Barel Morial Mouko (born 5 April 1979) is a Congolese professional footballer who plays as a goalkeeper for Daring Club Motema Pembe.

Club career
Mouko was born in Pointe-Noire. He started his career at his home nation Congo, having a brief spell at Gabonese AS Stade Mandji, before playing amateur football in France. In 2003, he joined Dijon FCO and became the starter goalkeeper, achieving promotion from the Championnat National in his first season. He left the club in 2008, signing for FC Gueugnon in 2009.

In the next season, Mouko was signed by his former Dijon manager, Rudi Garcia, to play for Lille OSC. At Lille, Mouko was a reserve to regular goalkeeper Steeve Elana. He made a few Ligue 1 appearances after Elana suffered a drop in form during 2013, but spent most of the playing time with the B team. He scored once in the 2013–14 Championnat de France amateur.

International career
Mouko was a regular for the Congo national team, appearing in 2014 FIFA World Cup qualifying.

In 2010, during the 2012 Africa Cup of Nations qualification, he scored the first goal of a 3–1 win against Swaziland from the penalty spot.

International goals
Scores and results list Congo's goal tally first, score column indicates score after Mouko goal.

Honours
Lille
 Coupe de France: 2010–11

References

External links
 
 
 
 

1979 births
Living people
People from Pointe-Noire
Republic of the Congo footballers
Republic of the Congo expatriate footballers
Republic of the Congo international footballers
2000 African Cup of Nations players
Ligue 1 players
Ligue 2 players
Championnat National players
Championnat National 2 players
Dijon FCO players
FC Gueugnon players
Lille OSC players
Daring Club Motema Pembe players
Association football goalkeepers
Expatriate footballers in Gabon
Expatriate footballers in France
Republic of the Congo expatriate sportspeople in France
AS Stade Mandji players
Republic of the Congo A' international footballers
2018 African Nations Championship players
Republic of the Congo expatriate sportspeople in the Democratic Republic of the Congo
Expatriate footballers in the Democratic Republic of the Congo
Republic of the Congo expatriate sportspeople in Gabon